The Boy in the Striped Pyjamas (released as The Boy in the Striped Pajamas in North America) is a 2008 historical drama film written and directed by Mark Herman. It is based on the 2006 novel of the same name by John Boyne. Set in Nazi-occupied Poland, the film follows the son of an SS officer who befriends a Holocaust prisoner of his age. It was released in the United Kingdom on 12 September 2008.

Plot
Bruno, an eight-year-old German boy living in Berlin, is uprooted to rural occupied Poland with his family after his father Ralf, an SS officer, is promoted. Bruno notices a concentration camp near the back garden from his bedroom window, but believes it to be a farm; his mother Elsa forbids him from going in the back garden.

Ralf organises Herr Liszt, a private tutor, to teach Nazi propaganda and antisemitism to indoctrinate Bruno and his sister, Gretel. This combined with Gretel's crush on Lieutenant Kurt Kotler, a young colleague of her father's, makes Gretel fanatical in her support for the Nazi agenda. Bruno struggles to adjust to the rhetoric in the teaching after Pavel, a doctor-turned-family slave, comes to Bruno's aid after he sustains a minor injury.

Bruno sneaks into the woods, arriving at a barbed wire fence surrounding the camp. He befriends Shmuel, another eight-year-old boy. Both boys are completely unaware of the true insidiously horrific nature of the camp: Bruno believes the striped uniforms that Shmuel, Pavel, and the other prisoners wear are pyjamas, while Shmuel believes he is only there temporarily and that his grandparents died from an illness on the journey to the camp. Bruno meets Shmuel regularly, sneaking him food, and learns that Shmuel is a Jew who was brought to the camp with his parents.

Elsa inadvertently discovers from Kurt that the smell from the camp is in fact burning prisoners; she angrily confronts her husband. Later that night, Kurt reveals his father left Germany for Switzerland to avoid national service and is berated by Ralf; embarrassed, Kurt viciously beats Pavel for spilling a glass of wine. Bruno sees Shmuel working in his home, and offers him cake. Kurt finds Bruno and Shmuel socialising and berates Shmuel. After seeing him eating, Shmuel informs Kurt that Bruno offered the cake, which Bruno fearfully denies. Bruno tries to apologise to Shmuel later, but he doesn't reappear at the fence for several days. Bruno clandestinely sees his father and other soldiers reviewing a propaganda film about the camp's conditions as positive. Bruno then hugs his father.

Ralf informs his family that Kurt was transferred to the Eastern Front; angered, Elsa reveals the reason for his transfer was because Kurt did not initially alert the authorities about his father. Bruno continues returning to the fence and eventually, Shmuel reappears, but with visible injuries. Bruno apologises and Shmuel forgives him. In Berlin, Ralf's mother Nathalie – who disapproves of the Nazi regime – is killed by an Allied bombing raid. At the funeral, Elsa tries to remove a wreath from the Führer out of respect for Nathalie and her beliefs, but Ralf stops her, causing them to fall out after the service.

Back home, Elsa informs Ralf she doesn't want the children living in the vicinity of the camp. In turn, Ralf then tells Bruno and Gretel their mother is taking them to live with extended family until the war is over. Bruno visits Shmuel before he leaves, and learns Shmuel's father has disappeared after being transferred to a different work gang; Bruno decides to help Shmuel find him. Shmuel provides Bruno with a prisoner's striped outfit and a cap to cover his unshaven head, and Bruno digs under the fence to join Shmuel, but the boys are suddenly rounded up by the guards.

Gretel and Elsa learn of Bruno's disappearance, and burst into Ralf's meeting to alert him. A search is launched and a dog tracks Bruno's scent to his discarded clothing. Ralf enters the camp as the prisoners are sent to a gas chamber, where pesticide pellets are poured from a hole in the ceiling, filling the chamber with toxic gas. Bruno dies in the chamber along with Shmuel, leaving Ralf, Elsa, and Gretel distraught.

Cast
 Asa Butterfield as Bruno, a young German boy
 Vera Farmiga as Elsa, Bruno's mother
 David Thewlis as Ralf, Bruno's father
 Jack Scanlon as Shmuel, a young Jewish boy
 Amber Beattie as Gretel, Bruno's older sister
 Rupert Friend as Lieutenant Kurt Kotler
 David Hayman as Pavel
 Sheila Hancock as Nathalie, Bruno's grandmother
 Richard Johnson as Matthias, Bruno's grandfather
 Cara Horgan as Maria
 Jim Norton as Herr Liszt

Production
Filming occurred during 29 April 2007 to 7 July 2007, in Hungary. Locations included Kerepesi Cemetery in Budapest, Sacelláry Castle in Budafok and several other areas of Budapest. Interiors were filmed at Fót Studios, Budapest. Post-production was completed in London. The total cost of the production was approximately $12.4 million.

Reception

Critical response
The Boy in the Striped Pyjamas has a 64% approval rating on Rotten Tomatoes, based on 142 reviews, with an average rating of 6.30/10. The site's critical consensus reads, "A touching and haunting family film that deals with the Holocaust in an arresting and unusual manner, and packs a brutal final punch of a twist." On Metacritic, the film has a normalised score of 55 out of 100, based on 28 critics, indicating "mixed or average reviews".

James Christopher, of The Times, referred to the film as "a hugely affecting film. Important, too". Manohla Dargis, of The New York Times, said the film "trivialized, glossed over, kitsched up, commercially exploited and hijacked [the Holocaust] for a tragedy about a Nazi family".

In the Chicago Sun-Times, Roger Ebert gave the film three and a half stars out of four and said that it is not simply a reconstruction of Germany during the war, but is "about a value system that survives like a virus".

Kelly Jane Torrance in the Washington Times said the film was moving and beautifully told. In spite of some criticism, Ty Burr of The Boston Globe filed this conclusion: "what saves The Boy in the Striped Pajamas from kitsch is the cold, observant logic of Herman's storytelling".

Scholarly reception
Scholars have criticised the film, saying that it obscures the historical facts about the Holocaust and creates a false equivalence between victims and perpetrators. For example, at the end of the movie, the grief of Bruno's family is depicted, encouraging the viewer to feel sympathy for Holocaust perpetrators. Michael Gray wrote that the story is not very realistic and contains many implausibilities, because children were murdered when they arrived at Auschwitz and it was not possible for them to have contact with people on the outside. However, according to Nazi records there were 619 male children at the camp; all female and many other male children were gassed upon arrival. A study by the Centre for Holocaust Education at University College London found that The Boy in the Striped Pyjamas "is having a significant, and significantly problematic impact on the way young people attempt to make sense of this complex past". However, a more recent study found that the film's reception is strongly based on the viewers' previous knowledge and beliefs.

Research by Holocaust educator Michael Gray found that more than three-quarters of British schoolchildren (ages 13–14) in his sample had engaged with The Boy in the Striped Pyjamas, significantly more than The Diary of Anne Frank. The film was having a significant effect on many of the children's knowledge and beliefs about the Holocaust. The children believed that the story contained a lot of useful information about the Holocaust and conveyed an accurate impression of many real-life events. The majority believed that it was based on a true story. He also found that many students drew false inferences from the film, such as assuming that Germans would not have known anything about the Holocaust because Bruno's family did not, or that the Holocaust had stopped because a Nazi child had accidentally been gassed. Other students believed that Jews had volunteered to go to the camps because they had been fooled by Nazi propaganda, rather than being violently rounded up and deported. Gray recommended studying the book only after children had already learned the major facts about the Holocaust and were less likely to be misled by it, while the Auschwitz-Birkenau State Museum and others cited it as a book/film that should be avoided entirely, and recommendations were made that true accounts, and works from Jewish authors should be prioritised.

Accolades

References

Further reading

External links
 
 
 
 Production notes
 "The Problem with The Boy in the Striped Pyjamas by Hannah May Randall (31 May 19) about the book

2008 films
2008 drama films
2000s historical drama films
Anti-war films about World War II
American World War II films
American historical drama films
American war drama films
BBC Film films
British historical drama films
British war drama films
Films about children
Films about families
Films about friendship
Films based on Irish novels
Films produced by David Heyman
Films scored by James Horner
Films set in 1942
Films set in Germany
Heyday Films films
2008 independent films
Holocaust films
Films shot in Budapest
Films directed by Mark Herman
British World War II films
Films set in Poland
2000s English-language films
2000s American films
2000s British films